Emil Petrov (born 19 June 1996) is a Bulgarian footballer who currently plays as a right winger and right-back for Septemvri Simitli.

Career

Litex Lovech
On 14 June 2017 he returned in his youth club Litex Lovech.

Career statistics

Club

References

External links

Living people
1996 births
Bulgarian footballers
Bulgaria youth international footballers
Association football midfielders
PFC Litex Lovech players
PFC Lokomotiv Mezdra players
PFC CSKA Sofia players
PFC Spartak Pleven players
OFC Pirin Blagoevgrad players
FC Septemvri Simitli players
First Professional Football League (Bulgaria) players